Dmitri Samoylov may refer to:
 Dmitry Samoylov (pilot) (1922–2012), credited as a flying ace in the Korean War
 Dmitri Samoylov (footballer, born 1990), Russian football player
 Dmitri Samoylov (footballer, born 1993), Russian football player